The 2005 NASCAR Busch Series began with the Hershey's Take 5 300 at Daytona International Speedway and concluded with the Ford 300 at Homestead-Miami Speedway. Martin Truex Jr. of Chance 2 Motorsports was crowned champion for the second consecutive year.

The year saw at least two significant changes:
The top 30 teams in the previous season's owner points, provided that they attempted all races that season, were guaranteed starting spots in the first five races of 2005.  However, only 26 teams met the criteria, so for those races additional spots were available for teams having to qualify on time.  After the fifth race, the top 30 teams received the guaranteed starting spots.
The series ran on the Autódromo Hermanos Rodríguez road course in Mexico City in March. It was the first Busch Series race conducted outside the United States.

2005 teams and drivers 
List of teams which competed throughout 2005.

Complete schedule

Limited schedule

Schedule

Races

Hershey's Take 5 300 

The Hershey's Take 5 300 was held on February 19 at Daytona International Speedway. Joe Nemechek was the polesitter.

Top ten results

33-Tony Stewart
21-Kevin Harvick
81-Dale Earnhardt Jr.
8-Martin Truex Jr.
38-Kasey Kahne
55-Robby Gordon
99-Michael Waltrip
66-Greg Biffle
41-Reed Sorenson
60-Carl Edwards

Failed to qualify: Skip Smith (#67), Brent Sherman (#58), Larry Hollenbeck (#62), Tim Sauter (#56), Mark Green (#26), Kevin Conway (#03), Justin Ashburn (#16), Keith Murt (#79), Matt Kenseth (#17), Jeff Kendall (#70), Shane Hall (#52), Kim Crosby (#24)

With his victory in the race, Tony Stewart became the ninth driver in NASCAR history to win a race in all three of its top series, needing only a Busch Series victory to complete this milestone. He would also be the first of seven drivers to accomplish the feat in 2005 alone and the only one to do it having needed a Busch Series victory.

Stater Brothers 300 

The Stater Brothers 300 was held on February 26 at California Speedway. Tony Stewart was the polesitter.

Top ten results

9-Mark Martin
21-Kevin Harvick
32-Shane Hmiel
2-Clint Bowyer
41-Reed Sorenson
60-Carl Edwards
64-Jamie McMurray
14-David Stremme
17-Matt Kenseth
90-Dale Jarrett

Failed to qualify: Eric Jones (#73), Kevin Conway (#03), Shane Hall (#52), John Hayden (#16), Kim Crosby (#24)

Telcel Motorola 200 
The inaugural Telcel Motorola 200 presented by Banamex was held on March 6 at Autódromo Hermanos Rodriguez. This race was the first NASCAR race held in Mexico. Mexican Jorge Goeters won the pole in his debut.

Top ten results
8-Martin Truex Jr.
21-Kevin Harvick
60-Carl Edwards
32-Shane Hmiel
1-Boris Said
64-Rusty Wallace
2-Clint Bowyer
22-Kenny Wallace
25-Ashton Lewis
5-Adrián Fernández

Failed to qualify: Paul Wolfe (#6), Jimmy Morales (#67), Todd Souza (#97), Kim Crosby (#24), Mark Montgomery (#16), Alfredo Tame Jr. (#92), Stan Silva Jr. (#65)

Sam's Town 300 

The Sam's Town 300 was held on March 12 at Las Vegas Motor Speedway. Carl Edwards was the polesitter.

Top ten results

9-Mark Martin
21-Kevin Harvick
14-David Stremme
87-Joe Nemechek
66-Greg Biffle
41-Reed Sorenson
60-Carl Edwards
34-Randy LaJoie
2-Clint Bowyer
27-David Green

Failed to qualify: Michael Waltrip (#99), Ken Schrader (#67), Jerry Robertson (#78), Eric Jones (#73), John Hayden (#16), Jeff Fuller (#24), Shane Hall (#52), Damon Lusk (#85)

Aaron's 312 (Atlanta) 

The Aaron's 312 was held on March 19 at Atlanta Motor Speedway. Carl Edwards was the polesitter.

Top ten results

60-Carl Edwards
33-Tony Stewart
48-Jimmie Johnson
17-Matt Kenseth
38-Kasey Kahne
66-Greg Biffle
99-Michael Waltrip
90-Elliott Sadler
64-Jamie McMurray
10-Michel Jourdain Jr.

Failed to qualify: John Hayden (#16), Aaron Fike (#43), Stan Boyd (#52), Damon Lusk (#85), Blake Mallory (#24), Reed Sorenson (#41)*

Reed Sorenson drove the #40 car normally driven by Sterling Marlin in the race, after failing to qualify.
.

Pepsi 300 

The Pepsi 300 was held on March 26 at Nashville Superspeedway. Reed Sorenson was the polesitter.

Top ten results

41-Reed Sorenson
22-Kenny Wallace
32-Shane Hmiel
60-Carl Edwards
2-Clint Bowyer
95-Bobby Hamilton
33-Tony Raines
35-Jason Keller
20-Denny Hamlin
59-Stacy Compton
This was Sorenson's first career victory.
Failed to qualify: John Hayden (#16), Damon Lusk (#85), Shawna Robinson (#23), Brian Sockwell (#88), Blake Mallory (#24)

Sharpie Professional 250 

The Sharpie Professional 250 was held on April 4 at Bristol Motor Speedway. Carl Edwards was the polesitter. Shane Hmiel, who finished 12th suffered a 25-point penalty after camera's caught him making an indecent gesture.

Top ten results

29-Kevin Harvick
21-Jeff Burton
41-Reed Sorenson
17-Matt Kenseth
40-Sterling Marlin
64-Jeremy Mayfield
60-Carl Edwards
25-Ashton Lewis
20-Denny Hamlin
66-Greg Biffle

Failed to qualify: Brad Teague (#52), Justin Ashburn (#16), John Hayden (#85), Tim Sauter (#56), Jay Sauter (#75), Eric McClure (#04)

O'Reilly 300 

The O'Reilly 300 was held on April 16 at Texas Motor Speedway. Shane Hmiel was the polesitter. 9th place Johnny Sauter was DQ'ed in post-race inspection for multiple infractions, including an engine with  more.

Top ten results

38-Kasey Kahne
66-Greg Biffle
41-Reed Sorenson
60-Carl Edwards
90-Elliott Sadler
2-Clint Bowyer
17-Matt Kenseth
47-Jon Wood
22-Kenny Wallace
32-Shane Hmiel

Failed to qualify: Aaron Fike (#43), Mark Green (#7), Kyle Busch (#57), Shawna Robinson (#23)

Bashas' Supermarkets 200 

The Bashas' Supermarkets 200 was held on April 22 at Phoenix International Raceway. Kasey Kahne was the polesitter.

Top ten results

66-Greg Biffle
90-Elliott Sadler
14-David Stremme
21-Kevin Harvick
33-Tony Stewart
87-Joe Nemechek
99-Michael Waltrip
60-Carl Edwards
8-Martin Truex Jr.
18-J. J. Yeley

Failed to qualify: Ryan Hemphill (#4)

Aaron's 312 (Talladega) 

The Aaron's 312 was held on April 30 at Talladega Superspeedway. Paul Menard was the polesitter.

Because of a long rain delay, and a delay caused by cleaning debris from a crash, this race ended near darkness, but was 120 laps (of 117) because of the green-white-checker finish rule.  It was the first time in Busch Series history a race had ended in prime-time network television, as the checkered flag waved at 8:20 p.m. EDT.

Top ten results

8-Martin Truex Jr.
47-Jon Wood
14-David Stremme
25-Ashton Lewis
98-Kerry Earnhardt
34-Randy LaJoie
44-Justin Labonte
35-Jason Keller
58-Brent Sherman
0-Kertus Davis

Failed to qualify: Greg Sacks (#7), Ryan Hemphill (#4), Geoff Bodine (#72), Donnie Neuenberger (#52)

Diamond Hill Plywood 200 

The Diamond Hill Plywood 200 was held on May 6 at Darlington Raceway. Jimmie Johnson was the polesitter.

Top ten results

17-Matt Kenseth
22-Kenny Wallace
8-Martin Truex Jr.
66-Greg Biffle
21-Jeff Burton
14-David Stremme
20-Denny Hamlin
6-Jeremy Mayfield
33-Tony Raines
2-Clint Bowyer

Failed to qualify: Eric McClure (#52)

Funai 250 

The Funai 250 was held on May 13 at Richmond International Raceway. Kasey Kahne was the polesitter.

Top ten results

60-Carl Edwards
90-Elliott Sadler
1-Johnny Sauter
79-Kasey Kahne
66-Greg Biffle
4-Jeff Green
9-Mark Martin
17-Matt Kenseth
2-Clint Bowyer
40-Sterling Marlin

Failed to qualify: Kertus Davis (#0), Brent Sherman (#58), Eric McClure (#52), Jeff Fuller (#7), Geoff Bodine (#72)

Carquest Auto Parts 300 

The Carquest Auto Parts 300 was held on May 28 at Lowe's Motor Speedway. Kasey Kahne was the polesitter.

Top ten results

5-Kyle Busch
40-Sterling Marlin
39-Ryan Newman
66-Greg Biffle
41-Reed Sorenson
19-Bobby Labonte
8-Martin Truex Jr.
14-David Stremme
22-Kenny Wallace
25-Ashton Lewis

Failed to qualify: Scott Riggs (#30), Jeff Fuller (#7), Todd Bodine (#43), Eric McClure (#52), Kevin Lepage (#72), Brian Sockwell (#88), Robert Pressley (#46)

MBNA RacePoints 200 

The MBNA RacePoints 200 was held on June 4 at Dover International Speedway. Carl Edwards was the polesitter.

Top ten results

8-Martin Truex Jr.
41-Reed Sorenson
64-Jamie McMurray
90-Dale Jarrett
5-Jimmie Johnson
33-Tony Raines
35-Jason Keller
66-Greg Biffle
22-Kenny Wallace
87-Joe Nemechek

Failed to qualify: Matt Kenseth (#17)

Federated Auto Parts 300 

The Federated Auto Parts 300 was held on June 12 at Nashville Superspeedway. Qualifying and the race were rained out when attempted on June 11, the order determined by owner points (not driver points).  The drivers who were racing in the June 12 Pocono 500 Nextel Cup race had that commitment, and left after the race was rained out -- Carl Edwards and Sterling Marlin did not participate as planned because of the rescheduled race. Johnny Benson drove Marlin's car, and Hank Parker Jr. took over Edwards' car. Martin Truex Jr. started first when the green flag waved per NASCAR rules.

Top ten results

2-Clint Bowyer
22-Kenny Wallace
41-Reed Sorenson
33-Tony Raines
8-Martin Truex Jr.
14-David Stremme
20-Denny Hamlin
18-J. J. Yeley
1-Johnny Sauter
6-Paul Wolfe
This was Bowyer's first career victory.
Failed to qualify: Justin Ashburn (#16), Eddie Beahr (#94), John Borneman III (#83), Travis Kittleson (#68), Burney Lamar (#83), Brad Teague (#53)

Meijer 300 presented by Oreo 

The Meijer 300 was held on June 18 at Kentucky Speedway. Carl Edwards was the polesitter.

Top ten results

60-Carl Edwards
8-Martin Truex Jr.
2-Clint Bowyer
41-Reed Sorenson
11-Paul Menard
40-Sterling Marlin
18-J. J. Yeley
59-Stacy Compton
6-Casey Atwood
47-Jon Wood

Failed to qualify: Kenny Hendrick (#03), John Borneman III (#83), Damon Lusk (#85), Jerry Robertson (#78), Brad Teague (#52)

SBC 250 

The SBC 250 was held on June 25 at The Milwaukee Mile. Johnny Sauter was the polesitter. Race shortened due to rain.

Top ten results
1-Johnny Sauter
8-Martin Truex Jr.
11-Paul Menard
18-J. J. Yeley
14-David Stremme
20-Denny Hamlin
34-Randy LaJoie
22-Kenny Wallace
33-Tony Raines
2-Clint Bowyer

Failed to qualify: Chad Beahr (#94), Todd Shafer (#91)

Winn-Dixie 250 presented by PepsiCo 

The Winn-Dixie 250 presented by PepsiCo was held on July 1 at Daytona International Speedway. Kevin Harvick was the polesitter.

Top ten results
8-Martin Truex Jr.
21-Kevin Harvick
66-Greg Biffle
22-Kenny Wallace
2-Clint Bowyer
11-Paul Menard
87-Joe Nemechek
6-Mike Wallace
32-Jason Leffler
33-Tony Raines

Failed to qualify: Mark Green (#23), Jeff Fuller (#7), Donnie Neuenberger (#52), Derrike Cope (#28)

USG Durock 300 

The USG Durock 300 was held on July 9 at Chicagoland Speedway. Ryan Newman was the polesitter.

Top ten results
21-Kevin Harvick
66-Greg Biffle
39-Ryan Newman
60-Carl Edwards
9-Mark Martin
2-Clint Bowyer
8-Martin Truex Jr.
17-Matt Kenseth
11-Paul Menard
41-Reed Sorenson

Failed to qualify: Mark Green (#23),  Tim Sauter (#56), Eric McClure (#52), Kerry Earnhardt (#73), Kim Crosby (#26), Chris Horn (#80), Jeff Fuller (#7)

New England 200 

The New England 200 was held on July 16 at New Hampshire International Speedway. Kevin Harvick was the polesitter.

Top ten results

8-Martin Truex Jr.
60-Carl Edwards
20-Denny Hamlin
90-Elliott Sadler
64-Jamie McMurray
18-J. J. Yeley
11-Paul Menard
21-Kevin Harvick
17-Matt Kenseth
36-Stanton Barrett

Failed to qualify: Derrike Cope (#28), Eric McClure (#52), Kim Crosby (#26)

ITT Industries & Goulds Pumps Salute to the Troops 250 

The ITT Industries & Goulds Pumps Salute to the Troops 250 was held on July 23 at Pikes Peak International Raceway. Clint Bowyer was the polesitter. It was the final NASCAR race to be held at Pikes Peak International Raceway before its closing at the end of the season.

Top ten results

27-David Green
2-Clint Bowyer
22-Kenny Wallace
8-Martin Truex Jr.
18-J. J. Yeley
64-Bill Elliott
41-Reed Sorenson
43-Aaron Fike
59-Stacy Compton
21-Brandon Miller
This is David Green’s final Busch Series win
Failed to qualify: Brad Teague (#24), Dale Quarterley (#72), Clint Vahsholtz (#90), Jennifer Jo Cobb (#73)

Wallace Family Tribute 250

The Wallace Family Tribute 250 presented by Shop 'n Save was held on July 30 at Gateway International Raceway. Martin Truex Jr. was the polesitter.

Top ten results

41-Reed Sorenson
6-Mike Wallace
60-Carl Edwards
27-David Green
11-Paul Menard
21-Brandon Miller
1-Johnny Sauter
2-Clint Bowyer
18-J. J. Yeley
33-Tony Raines

Failed to qualify: Jimmy Spencer (#73), A. J. Fike (#43), John Hayden (#85), Kim Crosby (#26), Eric McClure (#52)

Kroger 200 

The Kroger 200 was held on August 6 at Indianapolis Raceway Park. Reed Sorenson was the polesitter.

Top ten results

8-Martin Truex Jr.
2-Clint Bowyer
41-Reed Sorenson
35-Jason Keller
14-David Stremme
20-Denny Hamlin
11-Paul Menard
27-David Green
1-Johnny Sauter
64-Mike Wallace

Failed to qualify: Wayne Edwards (#9), Brad Teague (#53), Kim Crosby (#26), Todd Shafer (#91)

Zippo 200 

The Zippo 200 was held on August 13 at Watkins Glen International. Tony Stewart was the polesitter.

Top ten results

39-Ryan Newman
55-Robby Gordon
57-Brian Vickers
33-Tony Stewart
8-Martin Truex Jr.
21-Jeff Burton
87-Joe Nemechek
11-Paul Menard
32-Jorge Goeters
18-J. J. Yeley

Failed to qualify: Stan Silva Jr. (#65), Todd Souza (#97), Mark Green (#23), Paul Bonacorsi (#72), Elliott Sadler (#08), Scott Turner (#52), Joe Fox (#0), Kerry Earnhardt (#73), Jeff Spraker (#63), Kim Crosby (#26)

Domino's Pizza 250 

The Domino's Pizza 250 was held on August 20 at Michigan International Speedway. Martin Truex Jr. was the polesitter. Jeremy Mayfield, who finished 23rd, was penalized 25 points for an unapproved adjustment found on his car during post-race inspection.

Top ten results

39-Ryan Newman
66-Greg Biffle
60-Carl Edwards
8-Martin Truex Jr.
18-J. J. Yeley
11-Paul Menard
19-Bobby Labonte
20-Denny Hamlin
90-Elliott Sadler
1-Johnny Sauter

Failed to qualify: Eric McClure (#52), Jamie Mosley (#28), Tim Sauter (#56), Jerry Robertson (#78), Kim Crosby (#26), Brian Vickers (#57)

Food City 250 

The Food City 250 was held on August 26 at Bristol Motor Speedway. Ryan Newman won his third straight Busch Series race. Kyle Busch was the polesitter. Reed Sorenson, who finished 12th, suffered a 50-point penalty for a tire violation.

Top ten results

39-Ryan Newman
66-Greg Biffle
21-Kevin Harvick
2-Clint Bowyer
1-Johnny Sauter
8-Martin Truex Jr.
81-Dale Earnhardt Jr.
64-Jamie McMurray
33-Tony Raines
19-Bobby Labonte

Failed to qualify: Ron Hornaday Jr. (#30), Jeff Fuller (#7), Eric McClure (#04), Kevin Lepage (#72), Ron Young (#71), Brent Sherman (#10), Brad Teague (#52), John Hayden (#85), Tim Sauter (#56), David Ragan (#16)

Ameriquest 300 

The Ameriquest 300 was held on September 3 at California Speedway. Clint Bowyer was the polesitter.

The race became the first in NASCAR's Busch Series to be televised live in its entirety in prime-time television, with the NBC broadcast beginning at 8:30 p.m. EDT.

Top ten results

60-Carl Edwards
66-Greg Biffle
2-Clint Bowyer
1-Johnny Sauter
6-Kasey Kahne
35-Jason Keller
32-Jason Leffler
22-Kenny Wallace
14-David Stremme
11-Paul Menard

Failed to qualify: Kevin Lepage (#72), Derrike Cope (#28), Jeff Fuller (#7), Michael Waltrip (#99), Mark Green (#23), Kim Crosby (#26)

Emerson Radio 250 

The Emerson Radio 250 was held on September 9 at Richmond International Raceway. Mark Martin was the polesitter. Martin Truex Jr., who finished 27th, suffered a 25-point penalty for making an inappropriate gesture.

Top ten results

21-Kevin Harvick
11-Paul Menard
17-Matt Kenseth
9-Mark Martin
32-Jason Leffler
90-Elliott Sadler
41-Reed Sorenson
19-Bobby Labonte
99-Michael Waltrip
66-Greg Biffle

Failed to qualify: Mark Green (#23), Kevin Lepage (#85), Tim Sauter (#56), Kertus Davis (#0), Brent Sherman (#10), Jason York (#72), Brian Sockwell (#88), Eddie Beahr (#94), Jerry Robertson (#78)

Dover 200 

The Dover 200 was held on September 24 at Dover International Speedway. Ryan Newman was the polesitter.

Top ten results

39-Ryan Newman
2-Clint Bowyer
32-Jason Leffler
41-Reed Sorenson
66-Greg Biffle
20-Denny Hamlin
64-Rusty Wallace
57-Brian Vickers
60-Carl Edwards
11-Paul Menard

Failed to qualify: Dale Quarterley (#71), Brent Sherman (#10), Derrike Cope (#94), Bryan Reffner (#67), Jerick Johnson (#76)

United Way 300 

The United Way 300 was held on October 8 at Kansas Speedway. Martin Truex Jr. was the polesitter.

Top ten results

6-Kasey Kahne
66-Greg Biffle
1-Johnny Sauter
21-Kevin Harvick
47-Jon Wood
41-Reed Sorenson
17-Matt Kenseth
5-Kyle Busch
8-Martin Truex Jr.
18-J. J. Yeley

Failed to qualify: Jorge Goeters (#73), Kertus Davis (#0), Mark Green (#23), Michael Waltrip (#99), Jamie Mosley (#28), Tim Sauter (#56), Kevin Lepage (#72), Derrike Cope (#71), Kim Crosby (#26), Chris Horn (#80), Chad Blount (#70)

Dollar General 300 

The Dollar General 300 was held on October 14 at Lowe's Motor Speedway. Jimmie Johnson was the polesitter.

Top ten results

39-Ryan Newman
90-Elliott Sadler
11-Paul Menard
60-Carl Edwards
40-Sterling Marlin
32-Jason Leffler
47-Jon Wood
25-Ashton Lewis
72-Kevin Lepage
44-Justin Labonte

Failed to qualify: Kertus Davis (#0), Michel Jourdain Jr. (#15), Michael Waltrip (#99), Steve Grissom (#49), Mark Green (#23), Johnny Benson (#67), Kim Crosby (#26)

Sam's Town 250 

The Sam's Town 250 was held on October 22 at Memphis Motorsports Park. Martin Truex Jr. was the polesitter.

Top ten results

2-Clint Bowyer
18-J. J. Yeley
8-Martin Truex Jr.
27-David Green
60-Carl Edwards
11-Paul Menard
20-Denny Hamlin
33-Tony Raines
1-Johnny Sauter
35-Jason Keller

Failed to qualify: Marc Mitchell (#86), Eric McClure (#04), Mark Green (#23), Travis Geisler (#72), Charlie Bradberry (#91), Kerry Earnhardt (#99), Brian Tyler (#80), Mike Harmon (#24), Justin Ashburn (#16), Brad Teague (#52)

O'Reilly Challenge 

The inaugural O'Reilly Challenge was held on November 5 at Texas Motor Speedway. Ryan Newman was the polesitter.

Top ten results

21-Kevin Harvick
66-Greg Biffle
60-Carl Edwards
41-Reed Sorenson
5-Kyle Busch
17-Matt Kenseth
2-Clint Bowyer
32-Jason Leffler
90-Elliott Sadler
1-Johnny Sauter

Failed to qualify: Michael Waltrip (#99), Kevin Lepage (#72), Ron Hornaday Jr. (#30), Eric McClure (#0), Chad Blount (#70), Jeff Fuller (#7), Chris Wimmer (#23), Jorge Goeters (#73), Steve Grissom (#49), Brent Sherman (#10), Tracy Hines (#92)

Arizona 200 

The Arizona 200 was held on November 12 at Phoenix International Raceway. Carl Edwards was the polesitter.

Top ten results

60-Carl Edwards
2-Clint Bowyer
17-Matt Kenseth
21-Kevin Harvick
66-Greg Biffle
8-Martin Truex Jr.
32-Jason Leffler
41-Reed Sorenson
20-Denny Hamlin
18-J. J. Yeley

Failed to qualify: Bobby Labonte (#19), Eric McClure (#04), Charlie Bradberry (#91)

Ford 300 
The Ford 300 was held on November 19 at Homestead-Miami Speedway. Ryan Newman was the polesitter.

Top ten results

39-Ryan Newman
66-Greg Biffle
9-Mark Martin
21-Kevin Harvick
11-Paul Menard
47-Jon Wood
8-Martin Truex Jr.
2-Clint Bowyer
27-David Green
87-Joe Nemechek

Failed to qualify: Jerry Robertson (#78), Michael Waltrip (#99), Dave Blaney (#31), Jamie McMurray (#09), Kevin Lepage (#72), John Andretti (#10), Travis Kittleson (#68), Steve Grissom (#49), Chris Wimmer (#23), Marc Mitchell (#86)

Final points standings 

The top 25 drivers in points were:

8-Martin Truex Jr.
2-Clint Bowyer
60-Carl Edwards
41-Reed Sorenson
20-Denny Hamlin
11-Paul Menard
22-Kenny Wallace
27-David Green
35-Jason Keller
66-Greg Biffle
18-J. J. Yeley
1-Johnny Sauter
14-David Stremme
25-Ashton Lewis
47-Jon Wood
59-Stacy Compton
44-Justin Labonte
21-Kevin Harvick
34-Randy LaJoie
33-Tony Raines
38-Kasey Kahne
36-Stanton Barrett
49-Steve Grissom
17-Matt Kenseth
87-Joe Nemechek

Results and standings

Race results

Drivers' championship

(key) Bold – Pole position awarded by time. Italics – Pole position set by owner's points. * – Most laps led.

Rookie of the Year 
Carl Edwards won five times, nailed down four pole positions, had 21 top-ten finishes, earning him Busch Series Rookie of the Year honors while he simultaneously competed in the NEXTEL Cup Series that season. 19-year-old Reed Sorenson had two wins finished second in the running, only 158 points away from overtaking Edwards in the championship points, while for late-model racer Denny Hamlin finished fifth in points despite not winning a race. After that, the field was limited, as only Jon Wood, Brent Sherman, and Kertus Davis made full attempts at Rookie of the Year. Michel Jourdain Jr. started the year with ppc Racing, was released from the team, then came back to the organization with a different car, while Paul Wolfe, Ryan Hemphill, Boston Reid, and Blake Feese, only completed a partial season and were released from their driver development contracts. The field also featured Kim Crosby, the first woman contender for ROTY since Shawna Robinson, who only qualified for a mere handful of races with her Keith Coleman Racing team.

See also 
 2005 NASCAR Nextel Cup Series
 2005 NASCAR Craftsman Truck Series

NASCAR Xfinity Series seasons